The Undefeated (Neskorenyi) is a 2000 Ukrainian film by Oles Yanchuk, a producer and director previously praised by The New York Times and Time magazine for his 1991 film Famine-33.

Plot
In 1950, long after World War II has ended, a fight continues behind the newly drawn Iron Curtain: as the Ukrainians keep fighting Soviet forces, General Roman Shukhevych (Hryhoriy Hladiy) is forced by brutal circumstances to lead a guerrilla war as part of the Ukrainian Insurgent Army (UPA).

The film explores Shukhevych, both as a military leader and a family man. In the end, Shukhevych was unable to defeat the Soviet forces and was killed in a targeted assassination by the MGB, but the UPA re-enforce Ukrainian nationalism as an underground force until the end of the Cold War.

Cast
 Hryhoriy Hladiy — Roman Shukhevych
 Victoria Malektorovych — Halyna Dydyk
 Serhiy Romaniuk — Soloviov
 Viktor Stepanov — NKVD major
 Svitlana Vatamaniuk — Natalka Shukhevych
 Dmytro Myrhorodskyi — Yosyp Shukhevych
 Volodymyr Horianskyi — agent Pashkevych
 Yaroslav Muka — Stepan Bandera
and others

Production notes
The Undefeated was filmed at the "Studio Oles-film" with the monetary assistance from the Ukrainian Congress Committee of America (UCCA), with the National Cinema Studio of feature films named after O. Dovzhenko. The film's chief advisor was Ukrainian American specialist Askold Lozynsky. It was filmed on location in the Carpathian Mountains of Ukraine, and such remarkable cities of Ukraine as Odesa, Kyiv and Lviv,

External links 
 

2000 films
Ukrainian war drama films
Ukrainian-language films
Films set in Ukraine
Cold War films